Piz Bernina (Romansh) is the highest mountain in the Eastern Alps, the highest point of the Bernina Range, and the highest peak in the Rhaetian Alps. It rises  and is located south of Pontresina and near the major Alpine resort of St. Moritz, in the Engadin valley. Although the summit lies within Switzerland, the massif is on the border with Italy. The "shoulder" known as La Spedla is the highest point in the Italian Lombardy region.

Piz Bernina is entirely surrounded by glaciers, of which the largest is the Morteratsch Glacier.

The mountain was named after the Bernina Pass in 1850 by Johann Coaz, who also made the first ascent. The prefix Piz comes from the Romansch language in Graubünden; any mountain with that name can be readily identified as being located in southeastern Switzerland.

Geography 

Piz Bernina is one of the few isolated Alpine four-thousanders and the most topographically isolated mountain of Switzerland. It is the culminating point of a group of summits slightly lower than  mostly lying on the main watershed between Switzerland and Italy (such as Piz Scerscen, Piz Zupò, and Piz Palü).

The summit itself is located on a perpendicular chain (orientated north–south) starting at La Spedla on the border and finishing at Piz Chalchagn, composed also of Piz Morteratsch and Piz Boval.

Piz Bernina separates two glacial valleys, the Tschierva Glacier on the west and the Morteratsch Glacier on the east. The waters flowing on both side of the mountain end up in the Inn River running northeast through Engadin. South of Piz Bernina the watershed separates the drainage basins of the Danube (Black Sea) and the Po River (Adriatic Sea). The summit of Piz Bernina is the culminating point of the Danube drainage basin. Politically, it is split between the municipalities of Samedan and Pontresina.

Geology 
The rocks composing Piz Bernina are mostly diorites and gabbros. The massif in general is also composed of granites, notable on Piz Corvatsch and Piz Palü. Most of the range belongs to the Austroalpine nappes, a tectonic unit whose rocks come from the Apulian plate, a small continent which broke away from Africa (Gondwana) before the Alpine orogeny. The Austroalpine nappes are common throughout all of the Eastern Alps.

Climbing history 
The first ascent was made via the east ridge in 1850 by the 28-year-old topographer Johann Wilhelm Coaz (1822–1918, from S-Chanf) and his assistants, the brothers Jon and Lorenz Ragut Tscharner. On 13 September 1850, shortly after 6 a.m., they left the Bernina Inn (at ) with their measuring instruments. They traversed the Labyrinth (on the Morteratsch Glacier) and headed to the Fuorcla Crast'Agüzza, a col between the Crast' Agüzza and Piz Bernina. They reached the summit at around 6 p.m.

Johan Coaz wrote in his diary:
"At 6 p.m. we stood on the ardently desired lofty peak. On soil that no human had trodden upon before. On the highest point of the canton at 4052 meters above sea level."

"Serious thoughts took hold of us. Greedy eyes surveyed the land up to the distant horizon, and thousands and thousands of mountain peaks surrounded us, rising as rocks from the glittering sea of ice. We stared amazed and awe-struck across this magnificent mountain world."

In 1866, the south ridge running from La Spedla was climbed by Francis Fox Tuckett and F. A. Y. Brown with guides Christian Almer and F. Andermatten. They started at midnight from the Alpe Foppa on the Italian side, and reached the summit at 11 a.m., descending to Pontresina only a few hours later.

The first attempt to climb the northern ridge, the Biancograt, was made on 12 August 1876 by Henri Cordier and Thomas Middlemore with guides Johann Jaun and Kaspar Maurer. They successfully reached the top of the ridge, Piz Alv, but when they saw the chasm lying between them and the summit of Piz Bernina, they considered it to be beyond their powers and returned down the Biancograt. Cordier later declared the gap to be "absolutely impossible".

Exactly two years later, Paul Güssfeldt, accompanied by the guides H. Grass and J. Gross, reached the summit via the Biancograt and accomplished the first complete ascent on this route. The first winter ascent was made on 15 March 1929 by C. Colmus with guides C. and U. Grass. To win a bet worth 200 CHF, Hermann Buhl reached the summit of Piz Bernina from the Boval hut in 6 hours; he then descended the north ridge in only 15 minutes, establishing a record.

Tourism 
Piz Bernina is the highest summit of the Engadin region and lies close to the resorts of St. Moritz and Pontresina. The mountain can be seen from different viewpoints with the use of ski-lifts from Diavolezza, Piz Corvatsch or Piz Nair. The Bernina railway connects St. Moritz with the southern Val Poschiavo through the Bernina Pass.

Climbing routes and huts 

The north ridge, called the Biancograt or Crast Alva (both meaning White Ridge), is the most well-known and attractive route to the summit, and is much more difficult than the normal route. The route starts from the Tschierva Hut in Val Roseg, accessible from Pontresina. The Biancograt itself starts at the Fuorcla Prievlusa and leads to Piz Bianco. To reach the summit, the Bernina gap – which repulsed Cordier, Middlemore, Jaun and Maurer in 1876 – has to be traversed.

Other huts in the area
 Rifugio Carate Brianza – capacity 32 beds, 3 places in winter room
 Rifugio Marinelli Bombardieri – capacity 220 beds, 15 places in winter room
 Chamanna Boval – capacity 120 beds
 Chamanna da Diavolezza – capacity 234 beds

Panorama

Deaths on Piz Bernina
 1970: Rollo Davidson and Michael Latham

See also

 Exploration of the High Alps
 List of 4000 metre peaks of the Alps
 List of most isolated mountains of Switzerland

Gallery

References

External links 

  Italian route account.
 
 Piz Bernina on SummitPost
 Piz Bernina on Hikr

Mountains of the Alps
Alpine four-thousanders
Bernina Range
Mountains of Graubünden
Mountains partially in Italy
Engadin
Samedan
Pontresina
Highest points of Swiss cantons
Rhaetian Alps
Mountains of Switzerland
Four-thousanders of Switzerland